Roy Sinclair (10 December 1944 – 12 January 2013) was an English professional football midfielder. He spent eleven seasons in the lower English divisions before moving to the United States where he played in the North American Soccer League, American Soccer League and Major Indoor Soccer League.

Player
Sinclair began his playing days in his native England but would go on to enjoy several years playing in the USA. In 1973, he broke his leg which forced him to miss the 1973–1974 season. He them moved to the United States where he signed with the Seattle Sounders of the North American Soccer League. He played 20 games, scoring one goal, during the 1974 season. That year, he was an Honorable Mention All Star. In 1975, he played only one game before moving to the Denver Dynamos. He injured his Achilles tendon during the season limiting his number of games with the Dynamos. The team released him at the end of the season and he returned to the Pacific Northwest to sign with the expansion Tacoma Tides in the American Soccer League for the 1976 season. The team lasted only one season before withdrawing from the league. In 1978, he signed with the Detroit Express in the NASL. In the fall of 1978, he moved indoors with the Cleveland Force of the Major Indoor Soccer League. He played three seasons with the Force. In the summer of 1979, he spent the summer outdoor season with the Columbus Magic and the 1980 summer season with the Cleveland Cobras, both in the American Soccer League. Sinclair retired from playing in 1981.

Coach
In 1976, he coached the Bellevue Community College team to the Washington State championship. In 1989, he became the head coach of the Chief Sealth High School boys' soccer team. In 1986, he became the head coach of Seattle University

References

External links
NASL Stats
Sinclair's career overview

1944 births
2013 deaths
American Soccer League (1933–1983) players
Association football midfielders
Chester City F.C. players
Cleveland Cobras players
Cleveland Force (original MISL) players
Columbus Magic players
Denver Dynamos players
Detroit Express players
English expatriate football managers
English expatriate footballers
English expatriate sportspeople in the United States
English Football League players
English football managers
English footballers
Expatriate soccer managers in the United States
Expatriate soccer players in the United States
Footballers from Liverpool
High school soccer coaches in the United States
Major Indoor Soccer League (1978–1992) players
North American Soccer League (1968–1984) indoor players
North American Soccer League (1968–1984) players
Seattle Redhawks men's soccer coaches
Seattle Sounders (1974–1983) players
Tacoma Tides players
Tranmere Rovers F.C. players
Watford F.C. players